Haliclona (Gellius) rava is a species of demosponge in the family Chalinidae. It is found off the coast of Ireland.

References

External links 

  

rava
Sponges described in 1912
Fauna of Ireland